The Internationaux de Tennis de Vendée is a tennis tournament held in Mouilleron-le-Captif, France since 2013. The event is part of the ATP Challenger Tour and is played on indoor hard courts.

Past finals

Singles

Doubles

External links
 Official website

 
ATP Challenger Tour
Tennis tournaments in France
Hard court tennis tournaments